Geoffrey Bond Lewis (July 31, 1935 – April 7, 2015) was an American actor. He appeared in more than 200 films and television shows, and was principally known for his film roles alongside Clint Eastwood and Robert Redford. He often portrayed villains or quirky characters.

Life and career
Lewis was born July 31, 1935, in Plainfield, New Jersey, but spent much of his youth in Wrightwood, California. He studied theater arts at San Bernardino Valley College for two years, then worked as a truck driver and at other odd jobs before launching his career as an actor. He took acting classes at the Neighborhood Playhouse in New York City and performed off-Broadway and at regional theaters in Massachusetts. He tried breaking into Hollywood in the 1960s.

Lewis appeared in TV series' including Bonanza, Gunsmoke, Mannix, Mission: Impossible, Cannon, Barnaby Jones, Mork & Mindy, The Golden Girls, Lou Grant, Mama's Family, Magnum, P.I., The A-Team, Titus,  Murder, She Wrote, The X-Files, Little House on the Prairie, Highway to Heaven, Starsky & Hutch, Walker, Texas Ranger and Law & Order: Criminal Intent. In 1979, he appeared in Salem's Lot. He also played opposite Polly Holliday in the Alice spin-off Flo (1980–81) for which he received a Golden Globe nomination.  He co-starred with Fred Dryer in Land's End (1995–96).

His film credits include such movies as Down in the Valley, The Butcher, Maverick, and When Every Day Was the Fourth of July.

Lewis worked frequently with actor-director Clint Eastwood in several films including Midnight in the Garden of Good and Evil, Pink Cadillac, Any Which Way You Can, Bronco Billy,  Every Which Way but Loose, Thunderbolt and Lightfoot, and High Plains Drifter.

In the 1980s, Lewis was also a member of musical storytelling group Celestial Navigations with musician and songwriter Geoff Levin.

Personal life
Lewis was married three times and had numerous children. Some news outlets reported he had nine surviving children, others, 10 children. One of his children is actress Juliette Lewis with whom he acted in at least two films, Blueberry (aka Renegade) and The Way of the Gun. His other children include his daughters Brandy, Hannah and Dierdre Lewis and Emily Colombier; his sons Peter, Lightfield, Miles and Matthew; and nine grandchildren. 

On April 7, 2015, he died of a heart attack at age 79. He had suffered the heart attack while working out at the Motion Picture & Television Country House and Hospital, according to his family. Miles Lewis told Variety he had been suffering from Parkinson’s and dementia.

Filmography (selected)

References

External links

Geoffrey Lewis; Aveleyman.com
Celestial Navigations official website

1935 births
2015 deaths
American male film actors
American male television actors
American people of Welsh descent
American Scientologists
Male actors from California
Male actors from New Jersey
Male Spaghetti Western actors
People from Plainfield, New Jersey
People from San Bernardino County, California
20th-century American male actors
21st-century American male actors